Going Baroque (released as Going Baroque: de Bach aux Baroques in France) is the second album released by the Paris-based Swingle Singers.  The album was a 1964 Grammy award winner for "Best Performance by a Chorus."

Tracks from this album are also included on the CD re-issue / compilation, Anyone for Mozart, Bach, Handel, Vivaldi? and on the 11 disk Philips boxed set, Swingle Singers.

Track listing
"Badinerie" from Ouvertüre H-Moll, BWV 1067 (J.S. Bach) – 1:21
"Aria And Variations" ("The Harmonious Blacksmith") from Cembalo suite in E-Dur (G.F. Händel) – 2:25
"Gigue" from Cello suite Nr. 3 C-Dur, BWV 1009 (J.S. Bach) – 1:21
"Largo" from Cembalo konzert F-Moll, BWV 1056 (J.S. Bach) – 3:02
"Praeludium Nr. 19 A-Dur" BWV 864 (J.S. Bach) – 1:11
"Praeambulum" from Partita Nr. 5 G-Dur BWV 829 (J.S. Bach) – 2:27
"Fuga" from Concerto Op. 3 'L'Estro Armonico' Nr. 11 D-Moll (Vivaldi) – 2:24
"Allegro" from Concerto Grosso Op. 6 A-Moll (G.F. Händel) – 3:16
"Praeludium Nr. 7 Es-Dur" BWV 876 (J.S. Bach) – 2:42
"Solfegietto C-Moll" (C.P.E. Bach) – 0:57
"Frühling" (Spring) (W.F. Bach) – 1:35
"Praeludium Nr. 24 H-Moll" BWV 893 (J.S. Bach) – 1:56

Personnel
Vocals:
Jeanette Baucomont – soprano
Christiane Legrand – soprano
Anne Germain – alto
Claudine Meunier – alto
Ward Swingle – tenor, arranger
Claude Germain – tenor
Jean Cussac – bass
Jean Claude Briodin – bass
Rhythm section:
Guy Pedersen – double bass
Gus Wallez – Percussion

References

External links
Philips PHS 600-126 / Philips 546746
Going Baroque at [ allmusic.com]

The Swingle Singers albums
1964 albums
French-language albums
Grammy Award for Best Performance by a Chorus
Philips Records albums